Jukka Pertti Juhani Jalonen (born November 2, 1962 in Riihimäki, Finland) is a Finnish professional ice hockey coach and former player. In 2011, 2019 and 2022, he led the Finnish national team to the gold medal in the IIHF World Championship, and at the 2022 Winter Olympics, he coached the team that won Finland's first ever Olympic gold in ice hockey. He was the head coach of Jokerit in the Kontinental Hockey League during 2016–18 before returning to coach the Finnish national team.

Playing career
During his playing career, Jalonen appeared in two SM-liiga games for JyP HT in the 1985–86 season. He also played for JYP, Jääahmat and Lohi in lower divisions.

Coaching career
Jalonen started his coaching career with SM-Liiga sides, managing Ilves from 1992 to 1995, and Lukko during the 1996–97 season. Afterwards, he took over Mestis side Vaasan Sport for the 1997–98 season. After a one-year stint with Sport, Jalonen spent three seasons abroad. First, he coached HC Alleghe in Italy and then two seasons in the United Kingdom, with the Newcastle RiverKings and Newcastle Jesters in the British Ice Hockey Superleague, respectively. For the 2001–02 season, Jalonen returned to Finland and signed with HPK. He went on to spend six seasons with HPK, and led the team to remarkable success with placing third in the SM-liiga in 2001–02, 2002–03 and 2004–05. His era in Hämeenlinna reached a climax in 2005–06, when he led HPK to win the first Kanada-malja in the franchise history. The same year, he was awarded with the Kalevi Numminen trophy for being the best coach in the league. In his last season with HPK in 2006–07, Jalonen added yet another SM-liiga bronze medal to his record.

After his years in HPK, Jalonen started coaching the Finnish national team, first in the role of an assistant coach under Doug Shedden in 2007–08, and then as the head coach from 2008–09 onward. In 2010, Jalonen's team won the Olympic bronze medal in Vancouver, and in 2011 he coached the Finnish national team to the country's second World Championship title. In the final game, Finland defeated arch rivals Sweden with a score 6–1. While Jalonen remained as the head coach of the national team until the end of 2012–13 season, the national team failed to win additional medals under his tenure. During the 2012–13 season Jalonen signed with KHL side SKA St Petersburg, replacing Miloš Říha during the season. He went on to lead the team to conference finals in the Gagarin Cup. He stayed with SKA the following season, 2013–14, but the team's run ended in a loss in conference semi-finals.

For the 2016 World Juniors that were organised in Finland, Jalonen was hired to coach the Finnish U20 team. He successfully led the Finnish team to a World Junior Championship title on home ice, beating Russia with a score 4–3 (OT) in the final at the Hartwall Arena.

In the 2016–17 season, Jalonen returned to the KHL with the Jokerit. Jokerit made the playoffs but were knocked out in the first round of the Gagarin Cup. In 2017, Jalonen was re-elected to the Finnish national team as head coach, replacing Lauri Marjamäki after the 2018 World Championship. The contract originally covered the seasons 2018–20, and was later extended by another two years to include the 2021–22 season. After his successful performances, which included gold medals at the 2019 IIHF World Championship and 2022 Winter Olympics, and a silver medal at the 2021 IIHF World Championship, Jalonen extended his contract to 2024.

Coaching awards and honors

As head coach:
 Winter Olympics  (1): 2022
 Winter Olympics (1): 2010
  IIHF World Championship (3): 2011, 2019, 2022
  IIHF World Championship (1): 2021
  IIHF World U20 Championship (1): 2016
 Euro Hockey Tour (1): 2009–10
 Euro Hockey Tour (4): 2008–09, 2011–12, 2018–19, 2021–22
 Euro Hockey Tour (3): 2010–11, 2012–13, 2019–20
 IIHF European Champions Cup (1): 2007
 SM-liiga, Kanada-malja (1): 2005-06
 SM-liiga (4): 2001-02, 2002-03, 2004-05, 2006-07
 World U-17 Hockey Challenge: 1995
 European Junior Challenge: 1994.
As assistant coach:
 IIHF World Championship (1): 2008

Individual:
KHL All-Star Game: 2013, 2014, 2018
Finnish Coach of the Year: 2011, 2016, 2022
SM-liiga Coach of the Year (Kalevi Numminen Trophy): 2006
Finnish Hockey Hall of Fame (Jääkiekkoleijona): 2012
: Order of the White Rose of Finland: 2022

Trivia
Along with Mike Babcock, Jalonen is the only coach in history to have won both the IIHF World Championships and IIHF World U20 Championships.
Jukka Jalonen is no relation to Kari Jalonen, who succeeded him as the head coach of the Finnish national team.

References

External links

1962 births
Living people
People from Riihimäki
Finland men's national ice hockey team coaches
Finnish ice hockey players
Finnish ice hockey coaches
Universiade medalists in ice hockey
Universiade bronze medalists for Finland
Competitors at the 1985 Winter Universiade
Sportspeople from Kanta-Häme
Ice hockey coaches at the 2022 Winter Olympics
Finnish expatriate ice hockey coaches
Finnish expatriate sportspeople in Italy
Finnish expatriate sportspeople in England
Finnish expatriate sportspeople in Russia
Olympic gold medalists for Finland
Olympic medalists in ice hockey
Medalists at the 2022 Winter Olympics